River Ranch is a neighborhood within the city of Lafayette in Lafayette Parish, Louisiana, United States. It lies to the south of the Vermilion River in the city of Lafayette near the intersection of Kaliste Saloom Road and Camellia Boulevard. It is home to over 2,553 persons.

River Ranch is home to many independently owned businesses including dozens of retail shops, restaurants and bars. Area businesses include Paul Michael Company, City Club at River Ranch, the Backpacker, Hemline, the Tap Room and the Village Cafe.

The aesthetic influences found at River Ranch can be traced through the history and heritage of Louisiana. These seven major architectural influences are Caribbean, French, American Colonial, Creole, Acadian, Spanish and Neoclassical Revival.

Notable person

Billy Nungesser, Lieutenant Governor of Louisiana since 2015 and former president of Plaquemines Parish

References

External links
 River Ranch Development
 River Ranch Business Association

Unincorporated communities in Lafayette Parish, Louisiana
Unincorporated communities in Louisiana
Acadiana